The Long John Silver's 200 is a NASCAR Craftsman Truck Series race that takes place at Martinsville Speedway in the spring. 

In 2020, as part of schedule realignment, the fall race became the only Truck Series race at the track as NASCAR decided to give the track one Xfinity Series race instead. This schedule change was done in a swap with Richmond Raceway, which previously had two Xfinity Series races and zero Truck Series races and would now have one Xfinity Series race and one Truck Series race (which replaced the spring race at Martinsville).

In 2022, the fall Truck Series race at Martinsville was moved to the spring and there was no fall Truck Series race at the track for the first time since 2002.

History

Joe Ruttman won the inaugural Truck Series spring race, at Martinsville in 1999.

In the 2004 race, Brad Keselowski made his NASCAR national series debut.

Dennis Setzer's win in the 2008 race was the last Truck Series win for Dodge before they rebranded their Truck Series vehicles to Ram Trucks starting in 2009. It was also the last win for his team, Bobby Hamilton Racing, which closed down at the end of the season. 

In the 2013 race, Chase Elliott made his NASCAR national series debut. 

Kyle Busch won the last Truck Series spring race at Martinsville before the race was removed from the schedule in 2020.

When the Truck Series had a spring race at Martinsville again in 2022 as a result of the fall race being moved to the spring, the race length was 200 laps instead of 250 like the previous Truck Series spring races at Martinsville.

In 2023, Long John Silver's became the title sponsor of the race, replacing Blue-Emu.

Past winners

1996, 1997, 2004, 2007–09 and 2014–2016: Race extended due to a NASCAR Overtime finish.
2009: Race postponed from Saturday to Monday due to rain.
2014: Race postponed from Saturday to Sunday due to rain.
2018: Race red-flagged after 23 laps due to snow and rain, forcing the remainder to be postponed from Saturday to Monday.

Multiple winners (drivers)

Multiple winners (teams)

Manufacturer wins

References

External links
 

1995 establishments in Virginia
2019 disestablishments in Virginia
 
NASCAR Truck Series races
Recurring sporting events established in 1995
Recurring sporting events disestablished in 2019
Former NASCAR races